Obs is a chain of 31 hypermarkets throughout Norway managed by Coop Norge and owned by local cooperatives. The chain director is Lars Midttun.

History 
The first hypermarket opened in Trondheim in 1968 under the name DOMUS Stormarked.

Prior to 2001 the stores were only branded as Obs! Stormarked, from 2001 to 2006 Coop obs!, from 2006 to 2016 Coop obs! Hypermarked and again from 2016 as Obs.

Some of the Obs stores have Obs BYGG construction and hardware stores co-located with them.

List of stores
As of 2022 there is 31 Obs hypermarkets in Norway:
 Obs Alnabru
 Obs Arendal
 Obs Bryne
 Obs Buskerud
 Obs City Nord
 Obs City Syd
 Obs Harstad
 Obs Haugesund
 Obs Jessheim
 Obs Kvadrat
 Obs Lade
 Obs Lagunen
 Obs Lillestrøm
 Obs Mariero
 Obs Mo I Rana
 Obs Rudshøgda
 Obs Rygge
 Obs Sandefjord
 Obs Sartor
 Obs Slitu
 Obs Steinkjer
 Obs Sørlandssenteret
 Obs Tromsø
 Obs Tune
 Obs Vinterbro
 Obs Ålesund

References

Norwegian brands
Supermarkets of Norway
Coop Norden

sv:Coop Obs!